37 Days may refer to:
 37 Days (album), a 2007 album by Beth Hart
 37 Days (TV series), a 2014 British drama miniseries